Timothy H. Rigby is a politician in Ontario, Canada. He served as Mayor of St. Catharines from 1997 to 2006, and is currently a Niagara Regional Councillor.

Rigby is an insurance broker in private life, and was a partner with the Rose, Horne and Stevenson Group from 1979 to 1997.  He has also been active in the sports community, serving as the president of Rowing Canada and leading a successful drive for St. Catharines to host the 1999 World Rowing Championships.  In 1996, he was inducted into the St. Catharines Sports Hall of Fame.

Rigby was endorsed by outgoing Mayor Alan Unwin in 1997, and defeated city councillor Rick Dykstra by a significant margin.  As Mayor of St. Catharines, he received an automatic position on the Niagara Regional Council.  He was re-elected without opposition in 2000.  Rigby has tried to reduce St. Catharines's traditional dependence on industry, and to permit diversification in the high-tech sector.  He nonetheless joined with other southern Ontario mayors to seek federal and provincial assistance for Canada's automotive sector in 2002.

He was narrowly re-elected in 2003, defeating rival candidate Wendy Patriquin by 54 votes.  Rigby was 63 years old during this campaign.

Rigby supported the 2005 merger of Hamilton Hydro Inc. and St. Catharines Hydro Utility Services Inc., which created the third-largest electricity distribution company in Ontario.  He has also given support in principle to plans for a ferry service from St. Catharines to Toronto.  In June 2006, he led council in approving a controversial seventeen-storey condominium in the Port Dalhousie waterfront area.

On April 25, 2006, Rigby announced that he would not seek a fourth term as mayor.  He instead sought direct election to the Niagara Regional Council, and was narrowly defeated for the sixth and final regional seat in St. Catharines.  Rigby was, however, appointed to Regional Council as St. Catharines' sixth representative, replacing Peter Partington who will serve as Regional Chair.

Electoral record

The 2003 results are taken from the City of St. Catharines website, available here.  The 1997 results are taken from the Hamilton Spectator, 11 November 1997, B9. The final official results were not significantly different.

Footnotes

Mayors of St. Catharines
Living people
Year of birth missing (living people)